Just Like a Woman is a 1923 American silent comedy film directed by Scott R. Beal and Hugh McClung and starring Marguerite De La Motte, George Fawcett, and Ralph Graves.

Cast

Preservation
Prints of Just Like a Woman are located at the Library of Congress and George Eastman Museum Motion Picture Collection.

References

Bibliography
 Munden, Kenneth White. The American Film Institute Catalog of Motion Pictures Produced in the United States, Part 1. University of California Press, 1997.

External links

1923 films
1923 comedy films
1920s English-language films
American silent feature films
Silent American comedy films
Films directed by Scott R. Beal
American black-and-white films
Films distributed by W. W. Hodkinson Corporation
1920s American films